Pulgarcito was a Spanish-language monthly magazine put out by Mexico's Secretariat of Public Education from 1925 to 1932. The magazine published art and writing submitted by Mexican children in order to nourish cultural nationalism.

References 

Spanish-language magazines
Children's magazines
Defunct magazines published in Mexico
Magazines published in Mexico
Visual arts magazines
Magazines established in 1925
Magazines disestablished in 1932